Tracey Takes On is a book based on the HBO sketch comedy series of the same name, and is authored by its star Tracey Ullman.  The majority of the book's material is taken from the show's first two seasons. Sketches are presented in the form of letters, newspaper articles, diary entries, magazine interviews, questionnaires, and so on. Each character gets its own dedicated font and letterhead. The book is illustrated with official character press photos and screen captures. Like the series, each chapter opens with a personal story from Ullman in relation to each chapter's subject. Unaired or unused sketches and some new material can also be found in the book. The book also comes with character biographies and paper dolls.

Contents
 Introduction
 Character Biographies
 Childhood
 Royalty
 Mothers
 Crime
 Family
 Money
 Sex
 Fame
 Movies
 Health
 Politics
 Miscellaneous 
 Character Costumes

Critical reception
People Magazine gave the book a positive review, stating "[i]t's not for sensitive souls who are put off by gross and politically incorrect humor. But Tracey Takes On, like its wildly talented author, is very funny." Entertainment Weekly gave the book a B+.

References

External links
 Enter the antic world of Tracey Ullman
 CNN - Book Reviews Tracey Takes On February 6, 1998

1998 books
Comedy books
Tracey Ullman